Lockville is an unincorporated community in Fairfield County, in the U.S. state of Ohio.

History
Lockville was named for the locks on a nearby canal. A post office called Lockville was established in 1849, and remained in operation until 1921.

Notable person
Charles M. Borchers, U.S. Representative from Illinois

References

Unincorporated communities in Fairfield County, Ohio
Unincorporated communities in Ohio